Rabid Death's Curse is the first studio album by the black metal band Watain. It was released in 2000 on Drakkar Productions. It is notable as being the first and only album for which the band had two guitarists; from Rabid Death's Curse onwards, the band would be a trio. The song "Rabid Death's Curse" contains an audio sample from the film Friday the 13th. The album is considered a classic and was featured on German Rock Hard magazine's list 250 Black-Metal-Alben, die man kennen sollte ('250 black metal albums you should know').

Musical style and lyrics 
Ronald Ziegler of the German Horrible Eyes fanzine described the sound of Rabid Death's Curse as "very Swedish, very Death Metalish". According to Eduardo Rivadavia of AllMusic, the album "suggested that Watain were, at best, content to produce intentionally crude facsimiles of inspirational forefathers ranging from Bathory to Mayhem and, at worst, unable to do anything else".

Rivadavia described the production as "muddy" and "less-than-ideal". According to the band's vocalist, Erik Danielsson, "[t]here were some minor mistakes regarding the productions which could have been done better, but on the other hand it is stuff that you hear after listening to it through and through far too much. At least it does not sound as whatever cheap fucking 'primitive, cult, limited, true underground Black Metal' shit out there, which is a relief. I like the album, it's one of the better to come from Sweden, it's just my sense of perfection that haunts at times."

The lyrics are based upon "Satanism, or—to avoid confusion—Devilworship" and play "a terribly important role in our creations". Danielsson explained the title as "a rather personal attempt of mine to symbolically explain the idea of salvation through spiritual slavery and the will to serve. […] To put it briefly, the Rabid Death's Curse is the curse of life, the disease which we are condemned to suffer from until divine punishment comes upon us."

Artwork 
Davthvs was "responsible for almost the whole layout, as well as the rather successful idea of printing the LP inside out, so that the lustreless side was turned out". Danielsson, who draws artwork for Watain and other bands himself, was "very pleased in working with such a talented man". Davthvs found a dead bird and scanned it for the artwork. According to Danielsson, "there's  much symbolism behind the usage of the bird. A dead, decayed bird represents to me the death of freedom, and the beauty that lies in the silent process of its way into ashes and dirt. It also visualises the idea of the "Rabid Death's Curse" quite well, the molten dead lying in slumber,  walking towards the unescapable claws of Satan!"

Reviews 
Rivadavia wrote that although Rabid Death's Curse "suggested that Watain were, at best, content to produce intentionally crude facsimiles of inspirational forefathers ranging from Bathory to Mayhem and, at worst, unable to do anything else", "the Swedes were really just finding their feet" and the album "fulfills an important function in Watain's career arc, one that the casual listener need never pay heed to, but which loyal fans will likely want to explore at some point in order to better comprehend all that followed".

Track listing 

All songs written by Watain, except where noted.

The original LP version by End All Life Productions included the Sabbat cover "Curdle the Blood" which is not featured on the CD version by Drakkar Productions. The 2004 CD re-release includes Dødheimsgard cover "When Heavens End". The bonus track "The Essence of Black Purity" from Watain's first official release, the 7" The Essence of Black Purity, put out by the Swedish Grim Rune Productions, was added to the remastered 2008 CD re-release by Season of Mist.

Personnel
 H. (Håkan Jonsson) – drums
 P. (Pelle Forsberg) – guitars
 E. (Erik Danielsson) – vocals, bass
 C. (Crippe Blom) – guitars

Additional personnel
Davthvs – artwork, layout
Tore Stjerna – producer, engineering, mastering

References 

Watain albums
2000 debut albums
Season of Mist albums